Nancy Thompson is the name of:

Nancy Thompson (politician) (born 1947), Nebraska state senator
Nancy Thompson (A Nightmare on Elm Street), fictional character in the Nightmare on Elm Street film series